Gershon Iskowitz  (1919 – January 26, 1988) was a Canadian artist of Jewish background originally from Poland. Iskowitz was a Holocaust survivor of the Kielce Ghetto, who was liberated at Buchenwald. The circumstances of his early life—the trauma of the Holocaust and the uncertainty of the immediate postwar period, followed by immigration and adaptation to Canada—provide a lens through which to understand and appreciate his work. His early figurative images represent his tragic observed and remembered experiences while his later luminous abstract works represent his own unique vision of the world. Iskowitz's work does not easily fit into contemporary schools and movements, but it has been characterized as hard-edge, minimalist, abstract expressionist, and action painting.

Early life
Iskowitz was born in Kielce, in the Second Polish Republic. His father was Shmiel Yankl, generally referred to as Jankel; his mother was Zisla Lewis. Gershon was the third of four children; he had two brothers, Itchen and Yosl, and a younger sister, Devorah. At the age of four he was sent to the Chachmei Lublin Yeshiva. He became bored and began drawing. After a year and a half he begged his father to be allowed to return home and was given permission to do so. He was tutored in Polish and placed in a public school. After two and a half years his father set up a small studio area for him in their home and allowed him to spend his time drawing and painting. At the age of nine he exchanged original art posters for free admission to a local cinema.

World War II
He was accepted at the Academy of Fine Arts in Warsaw in 1939 and arranged to live with an uncle in the city, but a few days later, the German Army invaded the city and Iskowitz returned to Kielce. The Nazi persecution of the country’s Jewish population began almost immediately. On March 31, 1941, the occupying forces established the Kielce Ghetto, a few square blocks surrounded by barbed-wire-topped walls and locked gates. The Iskowitz family and all the other Jews in the city were forced to live there. They were soon joined by Jews transported from elsewhere in Poland for “containment,” and by August 1942, more than 25,000 people were jammed into this squalid area. In September 1943 the Kielce Ghetto was burned. Gershon and his brother, Yosl, were sent to Auschwitz.

Gershon painted or drew at night only after every one else was asleep. He said "Why did I do it? I think it kept me alive. There was nothing to do. I had to do something in order to forget the hunger. It's very hard to explain, but in the camp painting was a necessity for survival." He was transferred to Buchenwald in the fall of 1944. Near the end of the war he tried to escape but was seriously wounded. After the April 11 liberation of Buchenwald he was sent to recuperate in hospitals for about nine months.

From January to May 1947 he attended the Academy of Fine Arts Munich and had private study with Oskar Kokoschka who painted in an intense expressionistic style.

Life in Canada
Gershon's first application to move to Canada was rejected because he had a limp. "Always when my life was in danger," Iskowitz found "I did a drawing and pulled through." He reapplied and drew a picture for the bureaucrat in immigration. The fellow declared Gershon a genius, predicted a great future for him in Canada, approved his emigration application and said that Gershon would have special privileges on the voyage to his new home. Thus in 1949 he emigrated to Canada to stay with relatives living in Toronto.

In 1952 he attended the Artist's Workshop, Toronto (until 1959–60) and began sketching trips to Markham and Uxbridge. He stopped painting scenes from his past in the mid 1950s and turned to the Canadian landscape for his models. A major change in his painting style occurred in 1967 when a Canada Council grant permitted him to view the northern landscape from a helicopter. His painting became explosions of colour and light.

In 1954 he had his first exhibition with the Canadian Society of Graphic Art. He also did some part-time teaching at McKellar Lake. He moved to his own studio on Spadina Avenue, Toronto. In 1964 he became associated with Gallery Moos, where he had many solo exhibitions. A trip in 1967 to northern Manitoba where he viewed the estuary of the Churchill River at Hudson`s Bay from a bush plane resulted in a turning-point for his work - his 1969-1970 Lowland paintings. Uplands (1969) is in the collection of the National Gallery of Canada.

Gershon said "there was that period after '65 for a while when people would say, 'Do you still paint?' and I'd say, 'Yes, yes, I still paint.' And they'd say painting is dead, you know. Or if they didn't say that they'd say, 'Why don't you use acrylics?' Well, I tried them, but I stayed with oils, and the watercolours I'd been doing since I was a kid. It doesn't matter what you use, it matters how you use it."

In 1982 Gershon was honoured by the Art Gallery of Ontario (AGO) with a 40-year retrospective of his work. A subset of the exhibition was put on display in London, England. Gershon said [painting] "... is just an extension of myself. It's a plastic interpretation of the way I think. You reflect your own vision. That's what it's all about. Art is like evolution and life, and you've got to search for life, stand on your own feet and continue. The only fear I have is before starting to paint. When I paint, I'm great, I feel great."

In gratitude for the value that artistic grants had given to his career he established the charitable not-for-profit Gershon Iskowitz Foundation in 1985. Its mandate was to award the annual Gershon Iskowitz Prize, in association with the Canada Council in 1986 and 1987, of $25,000 to mature artists. The Foundation awarded the prize on its own from 1988 to 2006. It then partnered with the AGO in 2007 to award this prize as the winner would then receive an exhibition at the AGO.

He was made a member of the Royal Canadian Academy of Arts. On January 26, 1988, Gershon Iskowitz died in Toronto, Ontario.

Works in public collections in Canada
Over the years, many public art galleries have acquired, through purchase and donation, works by Gershon Iskowitz. Beginning in the mid-1960s, his work received critical attention and was shown in solo and group exhibitions nationally and internationally. In addition, in 1995 in celebration of the Prize’s 10th Anniversary the Foundation donated over one hundred and forty paintings and works on paper to many of these same institutions. The works have been included in major exhibitions and many are exhibited as part of the Permanent Collections of these institutions.

One-man exhibitions
The following table summarizes Iskowitz's one-man exhibitions:

Group exhibitions

Awards
 Victor Martyn Lynch-Staunton Award (1974)
 Queen`s Silver Jubilee Medal (1977)

Winners of the Gershon Iskowitz Prize
In 2007, the Gershon Iskowitz Foundation in partnership with the Art Gallery of Ontario (AGO) established the annual Gershon Iskowitz Prize presented by AGO in order to raise awareness of the visual arts in Canada.

References

Further reading

External links
National Gallery of Canada, Ottawa
Miriam Shiell Fine Art, Toronto

1919 births
1988 deaths
Academy of Fine Arts, Munich alumni
Canadian people of Polish-Jewish descent
20th-century Canadian painters
Canadian male painters
Buchenwald concentration camp survivors
Jewish Canadian artists
Jewish painters
People from Kielce
Polish emigrants to Canada
Members of the Royal Canadian Academy of Arts
Canadian contemporary artists
20th-century Canadian male artists